The 2003 MTV Video Music Awards aired live on August 28, 2003, honoring the best music videos from June 1, 2002, to June 9, 2003. The show was hosted by Chris Rock at the Radio City Music Hall in New York City. The ceremony is best remembered for Madonna kissing Britney Spears and Christina Aguilera during the show's opening performance.

Background
MTV announced on June 25 that the 2003 Video Music Awards would be held on August 28 at Radio City Music Hall and hosted by Chris Rock. Nominees were announced on July 24. The ceremony broadcast was preceded by the 2003 MTV Video Music Awards Opening Act. Hosted by Kurt Loder and SuChin Pak with reports from John Norris, Iann Robinson, Sway, and Gideon Yago, the broadcast featured red carpet interviews, pre-taped features on the career of Johnny Cash and a comparison between Eminem and 50 Cent, and performances from Sean Paul and Black Eyed Peas.

This was the final year to present International Viewers' Choice award in responding MTV's international affiliates.

Performances

Presenters

Pre-show
 Kurt Loder and SuChin Pak – announced the winners of the professional categories
 Carmen Electra, Dave Navarro and Iann Robinson – presented Breakthrough Video and Best Direction in a Video

Main show
 LeBron James and Ashanti – presented Best Hip-Hop Video
 Tony Hawk and Bam Margera – introduced Good Charlotte
 Kelly Clarkson and Ludacris – presented Best R&B Video
 Amy Lee, Ben Moody and Sean Paul – presented Best Video from a Film
 Crank Yankers – appeared in different vignettes presenting Viewer's Choice Award voting procedures
 Nelly and Murphy Lee – introduced Christina Aguilera
 OutKast and Iggy Pop – presented the MTV2 Award
 David Spade and Mary-Kate and Ashley Olsen – presented Best Pop Video
 P. Diddy – introduced Run-D.M.C. and presented Best Rap Video with them
 Hilary Duff, Lil Jon and Jason Biggs – presented Best Group Video
 Eminem and "Special Ed" (from Crank Yankers) – introduced 50 Cent
 Jimmy Fallon and the cast from Queer Eye for the Straight Guy – presented Best Female Video
 Fred Durst – introduced Jack Black and presented Best Rock Video with him
 DMX – introduced Mary J. Blige
 Kelly Osbourne and Avril Lavigne – presented the Lifetime Achievement Award to Duran Duran and presented Best Dance Video with them
 Justin Timberlake – introduced Coldplay
 Venus and Serena Williams – presented Best Male Video
 Mýa and Pamela Anderson – presented Best New Artist in a Video
 Pharrell and Chester Bennington – introduced Beyoncé
 Ben Stiller and Drew Barrymore – presented Viewer's Choice
 Adam Sandler and Snoop Dogg (with Bishop Don "Magic" Juan) – presented Video of the Year

Winners and nominees
Nominees were selected by a group of approximately 5,000 viewers and members of the music industry. Winners in general and professional categories were selected by a group of 500 members of the music industry. Winners of the Viewer's Choice award and the MTV2 Award were selected by viewers. Voting for the MTV2 Award and Viewer's Choice award was conducted on MTV's website and, in the case of the latter award, through phone voting that continued through the ceremony broadcast. 

Winners are in bold text.

See also
2003 MTV Europe Music Awards

References

External links
 Official MTV site

2003
MTV Video Music Awards
MTV Video Music Awards
MTV Video Music Awards